SDLP Youth is the youth wing of the social democratic and Irish nationalist political party, the Social Democratic and Labour Party (SDLP). Membership of the organisation is entitled to SDLP party members of the age 30 and under. It is organised throughout Northern Ireland and plays an active role within the SDLP at all levels of the organisation.

Organisation
SDLP Youth is currently organised across much of Northern Ireland, including University societies. The group is split into a number of branches with the executive committee acting as the governing body of the organisation.

Executive
SDLP Youth is organised at a national level by the Youth Executive. The Youth Executive is responsible for the day-to-day running of SDLP Youth. It consists of 7 Officers elected at the annual Youth Conference, usually held in the spring.

The current Officers of the Youth Executive elected in March 2021 are:

Branches
The current SDLP Youth branch organisations are:

SDLP Youth Antrim Branch
SDLP Youth Belfast - Paddy Wilson Branch
SDLP Youth Derry Branch
SDLP Youth East Derry Branch
SDLP Youth Mid Ulster - Paddy Heron Branch
SDLP Youth Newry and Armagh Branch
SDLP Youth West Tyrone Branch
Queen's University SDLP Society
Ulster University SDLP Society

Former SDLP branch organisations include:

Magee SDLP
SDLP Youth Strabane
SDLP Youth South Down
SDLP Youth Upper Bann

History

A youth section of the SDLP was first floated in late 1973 which led to the short lived group "the Young Social Democrats" which organised from 1974 to 1976.

The current youth wing started organising in the early 1990s bringing motions, such as the decriminalisation of marijuana, to party conferences but it wasn’t until 10 June 1995 that SDLP Youth became a distinct section of the SDLP when it was added to the party constitution.

International

SDLP Youth are full members of the Young European Socialists (YES), formerly the European Community Organisation of Socialist Youth (ECOSY), having been admitted at the 1994 conference in Munich. At this 1994 conference future SDLP MLA for South Belfast Conall McDevitt was elected as an ECOSY vice-president after being elected the National Secretary of Labour Youth in 1993. At 2021 YES Congress Leah Rea became the first member of SDLP Youth to be nominated and elected to the YES Presidium as Vice-President.

In 2016 SDLP Youth and YES held a joint seminar in Belfast on "far-right extremism and Brexit" which was attended by young socialist activists from across Europe.

SDLP Youth are also observer members of International Union of Socialist Youth (IUSY).

References

External links
 Official homepage of SDLP Youth 

Youth wings of political parties in Northern Ireland
Youth wings of social democratic parties
Social Democratic and Labour Party